This Is the Night is a 2021 American drama film written and directed by James DeMonaco. It stars Frank Grillo, Lucius Hoyos, Jonah Hauer-King, Bobby Cannavale, and Naomi Watts. Jason Blum served as producer under his Blumhouse Productions banner and Sebastien Lemercier served as producer under his Man in a Tree Productions banner.

The film released at the Angelika Film Center for a limited run on September 17, 2021 and was digitally released on September 21, 2021 by Universal Pictures.

Plot 
In 1982, a family must confront its greatest challenges and the family realizes that the only way to live is like there's no tomorrow.

Cast 

In addition, Frankie Montero plays gang leader Gus Giammarino, a brief but pivotal role.

Production 
On May 15, 2018, Blumhouse Productions and Man in a Tree Productions announced James DeMonaco would be writing and directing a drama film titled Once Upon a Time in Staten Island, with Naomi Watts, Frank Grillo and Bobby Cannavale starring in the film. On August 4, 2020, it was announced the film was re-titled This Is the Night.

Principal photography began on May 30, 2018.

Release 
The film had a one-week theatrical run on September 17, 2021 at the Angelika Film Center and was digitally released on September 21, 2021 by Universal Pictures.

Critical response

References

External links 
 

2021 drama films
American drama films
Blumhouse Productions films
Films directed by James DeMonaco
Films produced by Jason Blum
Films set in 1982
Films set in Staten Island
Films shot in New York City
Films with screenplays by James DeMonaco
Universal Pictures films
2020s English-language films
2020s American films